Tamin pseudodrassus is a species of long-legged sac spiders.

References

Miturgidae
Spiders of Asia
Spiders described in 2001